The Ordnance BL 6 inch 26cwt howitzer was a British howitzer used during World War I and World War II.

History

World War I

It was developed to replace the obsolescent 6 inch 25 cwt and 6 inch 30 cwt howitzers which were outclassed by German artillery such as the 15 cm schwere Feldhaubitze 13. Design began in January 1915, the first proof-firing occurred on 30 July 1915 and it entered service in late 1915. Its combination of firepower, range and mobility (for its day) made it one of the British Empire's most important weapons in World War I.

It was originally towed by horses but from 1916 onwards was commonly towed by the FWD 4 wheel drive 3 ton lorry as heavy field artillery. The wooden spoked wheels could be fitted with "girdles" for work in mud or sand to prevent them sinking. Towards the end of the war solid rubber tyres were fitted over the iron tyres on the wheel rims, giving the rims a heavier appearance. It fired 22.4 million rounds on the Western Front.

World War II

During the interwar period the carriage had its wooden spoked wheels replaced with modern steel wheels and pneumatic tyres. During World War II, its use was restricted after 1942 when the replacement BL 5.5 inch Medium Gun came into use but it was reintroduced in Burma due to a number of premature detonations in  guns. It was declared obsolete with the end of the war in 1945.

Captured examples received the designation FH-412(e) in German use.

Surviving examples

Royal Artillery Museum, Woolwich, London
Army Memorial Museum, Waiouru, New Zealand
Royal Australian Artillery Museum, North Head, Sydney, Australia
Museo della guerra (War Museum), Rovereto (Italy)
South Africa : The Imperial Government presented 6 howitzers to the Union of South Africa after World War I and the six South African Heavy Artillery Memorials were designed, commissioned and paid for by the South African Heavy Artillery Association to honour their fallen Comrades-in-Arms : Memorial to 71st (Transvaal) Siege Battery at Johannesburg Zoo (restored); 72nd (Griqualand West) Siege Battery at Clyde N Terry Museum, Kimberley; 73rd (Cape) Siege Battery at Company Gardens, Cape Town; 74th (Eastern Province) Siege Battery at National Museum, Bloemfontein (Restoration is about to begin, May 2009); 75th (Natal) Siege Battery, Warriors' Gate MOTH Shellhole, Old Fort Road, Durban; 125th (Transvaal) Siege Battery near the Union Buildings, Pretoria.
These guns are being restored by the Gunner's Association of South Africa
 National Museum of Military History, Saxonwold, Johannesburg, South Africa
The Central Museum of The Royal Regiment of Canadian Artillery, Shilo Manitoba
Barracks Green Armouries, Belonging to and restored by 3rd Field Regt.(The Loyal Company), Saint John, New Brunswick

World War I ammunition

See also
 BL 6 inch 30 cwt howitzer : British predecessor
List of howitzers

Weapons of comparable role, performance and era
Canon de 155 C modèle 1917 Schneider French equivalent
15 cm sFH 13 German equivalent
152 mm howitzer M1910 Russian equivalent

Notes and references

Bibliography
 Dale Clarke, British Artillery 1914-1919. Heavy Artillery. Osprey Publishing, Oxford UK, 2005 
 General Sir Martin Farndale, History of the Royal Regiment of Artillery. Western Front 1914-18. London: Royal Artillery Institution, 1986. 
 I.V. Hogg & L.F. Thurston, British Artillery Weapons & Ammunition 1914-1918. London: Ian Allan, 1972.

External links

 Handbook of the B.L. 6-inch 26-cwt. Mark I howitzer on Mark I travelling carriage, (land service), 1919. Hosted online by State Library of Victoria, Australia
 Gun drill for 6-inch B.L. 26-cwt howitzer Mark I carriage Mark I 1920  Hosted online by State Library of Victoria, Australia
 Gun drill for B.L. 6-inch 26 cwt howitzer Mark 1 carriage Mark 1 1926 Hosted online by State Library of Victoria, Australia

 Video clips on YouTube
 Nigel F Evans, British Artillery in World War 2. 6-Inch Howitzer
 W L Ruffell, BL 6-in 26-cwt howitzer
 6 inch 26 cwt Howitzer at Landships
 Walk around BL 6-inch 26-cwt howitzer WWI exposed to the Sacrario Militare di Redipuglia / Italy

World War I artillery of the United Kingdom
World War II artillery of the United Kingdom
World War I howitzers
152 mm artillery
World War II howitzers